A Giant Alien Force More Violent & Sick Than Anything You Can Imagine is a 2002 Venetian Snares single released on the Hymen label, consisting of one fifteen-and-a-half minute long experimental breakcore track (the track happens to have a 15/4 time signature). The packaging consists of a jewellery box-style case containing a 3" CD and a working television-shaped View-Master with a slide show of artwork from Hymen label owner Stefan Alt, AKA Salt. The single was limited to small number of copies and sold out within a week after its release.

Track listing
 "A Giant Alien Force More Violent & Sick Than Anything You Can Imagine" – 15:34

External links 
Hymen Records page for this release
 

Venetian Snares albums
2002 EPs